Ghost of a Chance is the second album of Danish band Turboweekend. Released in 2009 on RCA Records, it was the follow up to the band's debut album, Night Shift, and was certified gold.

In 2010, a deluxe two-disc edition was released.

Track listing
"Trouble Is" (3:16)
"Something or Nothing" (4:26)
"Sweet Jezebel" (4:26)
"Holiday" (4:08)
"Colors" (4:43)
"Up With the Smoke - Down With the Ash" (4:48)
"After Hours" (4:28)
"When I Erase Myself" (3:01)
"Your Body Free from Mine" (3:33)
"Good Morning Moon" (4:02)
"Almost There!" (4:27)

Charts

References

Turboweekend albums
2009 albums